To the Top may refer to:
 "Southern Mississippi to the Top", the official fight song of the University of Southern Mississippi
 "To the Top" (song), a song by Peter Andre from his self-titled debut album
 "To the Top", a song by Krokus from One Vice at a Time
 "To the Top", a song by Twin Shadow from his album Eclipse
 To the Top (TV series), a reality Philippine show on GMA Network